Dallas County may refer to:

Places in the USA: 
 Dallas County, Alabama, founded in 1818, the first county in the United States by that name
 Dallas County, Arkansas
 Dallas County, Iowa
 Dallas County, Missouri
 Dallas County, Texas, the ninth most populous county in the United States

Other uses:
 Dallas County Community College District, in Texas